The Treasurer of the Labour Party is a position on the National Executive Committee of the British Labour Party.

Although a post with little power, in the past, it was often hotly contested by people who later became big names in British politics: Arthur Greenwood beat Herbert Morrison in 1943, Hugh Gaitskell beat Aneurin Bevan in 1954, who in turn beat George Brown in 1956, while James Callaghan beat Michael Foot in 1967. Since the 1990s, the post has typically been held by a senior member of one of the larger Trade Unions.

Since the Political Parties, Elections and Referendums Act 2000 (PPERA) came into force, the Labour Party has had to register a Treasurer to the Electoral Commission, who becomes legally responsible for various returns to the Electoral Commission. It has been the practice of the NEC to register the full-time General Secretary as Treasurer under PPERA, rather than the elected volunteer Treasurer. This has created two Treasurer roles within the party, so to disambiguate these roles the elected Treasurer is often called Party Treasurer, and the PPERA Treasurer is often called Registered Treasurer. The party accounts are signed by both treasurers using these titles, though under PPERA only the General Secretary need sign them.

In 2008 the post was contested by the incumbent Jack Dromey and by human rights lawyer Mark McDonald, with Dromey being re-elected.  In 2010, former Deputy Prime Minister John Prescott was defeated by Diana Holland.

List of Treasurers
1904: Arthur Henderson
1912: Ramsay MacDonald
1929: Arthur Henderson
1936: George Lathan
1943: Arthur Greenwood
1954: Hugh Gaitskell
1956: Aneurin Bevan
1960: Harry Nicholas
1964: Dai Davies
1967: James Callaghan
1976: Norman Atkinson
1981: Eric Varley
1983: Albert Booth
1984: Sam McCluskie
1992: Tom Burlison
1996: Margaret Prosser
2001: Jimmy Elsby
2004: Jack Dromey
2010: Diana Holland

References

Organisation of the Labour Party (UK)
Labour Party